Lord Pearson or Baron Pearson may refer to:
 Sir Charles Pearson, Lord Pearson (1843–1910), Scottish politician and judge, Senator of the College of Justice 1896–1909
 Colin Pearson, Baron Pearson (1899–1980), Canadian-born British barrister and judge
 Malcolm Pearson, Baron Pearson of Rannoch (born 1942), British insurance executive and former leader of the UK Independence Party